Kazakhstan participated in the ninth Winter Paralympics in Turin, Italy. 

Kazakhstan entered two athletes in the following sports:

Nordic skiing: 2 male

Medalists

See also

2006 Winter Paralympics
Kazakhstan at the 2006 Winter Olympics

External links
Torino 2006 Paralympic Games
International Paralympic Committee

Nations at the 2006 Winter Paralympics
2006
2006 in Kazakhstani sport